The Donald E. Davis Arboretum, in Auburn, Alabama, United States, is a public native plants museum, and botanical arboretum with educational facilities, event spaces, and a conservation program. Its grounds, covering 13.5 acres (4.5 hectares) of Auburn University's campus, include cataloged living collections of associated tree and plant communities representative of Alabama's ecosystems, among which is mixed oak forest, carnivorous bog, and longleaf pine savanna. The living collections include more than 1,000 plant types, including 500 different plant species, with over 3,000 cataloged specimens. The Arboretum contains over a mile (2 km) of interwoven walking trails that meander through various southeastern biotopes.

The arboretum's Rhododendron and Azalea Collection is one of the more extensive native azalea collections in the nation and the nationally accredited Oaks Collection contains over 40 regional Quercus species.
The arboretum partners in a number of conservation projects through the Alabama Plant Conservation Alliance (APCA) hosted by Auburn University and largely coordinated by the arboretum.

History and mission 
In 1959, by the proposal of Prof. Donald E. Davis, the Auburn University School of Agriculture passed a resolution asking that a plot of land located immediately south of the university president's home be used as an arboretum for Alabama's native trees. The plot, which was just north of the Old Rotation, contained forest, wetland, and pasture. Davis began surveying and working the Arboretum after its approval in 1963. In 1977 the Arboretum was dedicated in his name. The mission of the Arboretum was established "to display and preserve living plant collections and native southeastern plant communities; to inspire an understanding of the natural world and our connection to it; and to promote education, research, conservation, and outreach."

At the turn of the century, the Auburn Forestry department worked with the arboretum to document 900 tree specimens on campus and the arboretum's plant accessions database was built to facilitate an acorn collecting program to track the provenance of its specimens. In 2002, Natureserve published a report showing that Alabama was among the most biologically diverse states in the nation. This is in part because of the state's intersection of many physiogeographic regions creating ranges of species overlap. Unfortunately, the state was also found to have the most extinctions in the continental US. In light of this, staff and faculty from Auburn's School of Biological Sciences were invited to a meeting of the Georgia Plant Conservation Alliance, and it was agreed that they would establish and host The Alabama Plant Conservation Alliance. The Arboretum staff and special collections curator, Patrick Thompson, began participating with state and federal conservation departments, private land owners, as well as other universities, and gardens in the statewide conservation program.

Conservation and collections
Along with working on in situ conservation projects throughout the state, the APCA starts ex situ populations with the aid of the arboretum's propagation program. The native plants nursery tracks accession provenance as well as participates in genomic ecotype studies with about 20 institutions. The Arboretum is also home to the only university plant collection accredited by the APGA’s Plant Collections Network in the SEC. It has one of two nationally accredited plant genera collections in the state of Alabama, the other being Huntsville Botanical Gardens Trillium collection.

Rhododendron
The Rhododendron collection is world-renowned, containing 60 varieties of Rhododendron and Azalea including its own Auburn Azalea Series of hybrids. During their period of bloom, the Arboretum is host to the Auburn Azalea Festival.

Quercus
The arboretum's conservation program has participated in The Tree Gene Conservation projects with APGA and the USDA Forest Service for four oak species including the rare Quercus boyntonii. It's oak collection contains all 39 of Alabama's oak species plus two more from Tennessee and Arkansas.  The collection includes Auburn University's Founders Oak (Quercus stellata), which became the most prized tree on AU campus, after the 2010 Iron Bowl arboricidal rampage on the ceremonious live oaks across from Toomer's Corner. The Founders Oak, considered the "heart of the Davis Arboretum", was planted in 1850, six years before the founding of what is now called Auburn University.

Carnivorous plants
The arboretum's Carnivorous Bog contains species from all carnivorous genera of the Deep South, Sarracenia (19 sp.), Drosera (3 sp.), Dionaea, Utricularia, and Pinguicula.

APCA projects
After 2014, the Arboretum partnered with APCA members conserving populations of endangered species from the Cahaba Ketona glade such as Xyris spathifoli. Other statewide APCA projects include the restoration of Harper's ginger (Hexastylis speciosa), Eastern turkeybeard, Pondberry, Giant whorled sunflower (Helianthus verticillatus), Green Pitcher Plant (Sarracenia oreophila), Alabama Canebrake Pitcher Plant (Sarracenia alabamensis), and various species in the 480 acre Haines Island Park on the Alabama River.

Other notable species
Some notable species in the arboretum's collection include:

A
Abies firma
Acer floridanum 
Acer leucoderme 
Acer negundo
Acer palmatum 
Acer rubrum 
Acer saccharinum 
Acer saccharum
Aesculus flava
Aesculus parviflora
Aesculus pavia 
Aesculus sylvatica
Agarista populifolia
Ailanthus altissima
Albizia julibrissin
Alnus serrulata
Amelanchier arborea 
Amelanchier laevis
Ampelopsis arborea
Aralia spinosa
Aronia arbutifolia
Asimina parviflora
Asimina triloba

B
Baccharis halimifolia
Befaria racemosa
Berchemia scandens
Betula nigra
Bignonia capreolata
Broussonetia papyrifera

C
Callicarpa americana
Calycanthus floridus
Campsis radicans
Carpinus caroliniana
Carya aquatica 
Carya cordiformis 
Carya glabra
Carya illinoensis
Carya laciniosa 
Carya myristicaeformis
Carya ovalis
Carya ovata
Carya pallida
Carya tomentosa
Catalpa bignonioides
Cedrus deodara
Celtis laevigata
Celtis occidentalis
Celtis tenuifolia
Cephalanthus occidentalis
Cercis canadensis 
Cercis chinensis
Chamaecyparis thyoides
Chionanthus retusus
Chionanthus virginicus
Clematis
Clethra alnifolia
Cliftonia monophylla
Cocculus carolinus
Conradina canescens
Cornus alternifolia 
Cornus amomum
Cornus florida
Corylus americana
Cotinus coggygria 
Cotinus obovatus
Crataegus cestivalis 
Crataegus uniflora
Croton alabamensis
Cupressocyparis leylandii
Cupressus arizonica
Cyrilla racemiflora

D
Diospyros virginiana

E
Erythrina herbacea
Euonymus americanus

F
Fagus grandifolia
Firmiana simplex
Fraxinus americana 
Fraxinus pennsylvanica

G
Gelsemium sempervirens
Ginkgo biloba
Gleditsia triacanthos
Gordonia lasianthus
Gymnocladus dioicus

H
Halesia carolina 
Halesia diptera
Hydrangea arborescens 
Hydrangea quercifolia
Hypericum frondosa

I
Ilex cassine
Ilex decidua
Ilex opaca
Ilex vomitoria
Ilex × attenuata
Illicium floridanum
Iris virginica
Itea virginica

J
Juglans cinerea
Juglans nigra
Juniperus virginiana

K
Kalmia latifolia

L
Laurus nobilis
Leucothoe racemosa
Leucothoe axillaris
Lindera benzoin
Liquidambar styraciflua
Liriodendron tulipifera
Lithocarpus henryi
Lonicera sempervirens

M
Maclura pomifera
Magnolia acuminata
Magnolia grandiflora
Magnolia macrophylla
Magnolia pyramidata
Magnolia tripetala
Malus angustifolia
Melia azedarach
Metasequoia glyptostroboides
Morus rubra
Myrica cerifera
Myrica heterophylla

N
Nerium oleander
Neviusia alabamensis
Nyssa aquatica
Nyssa ogeche
Nyssa sylvatica

O
Osmanthus americanus
Ostrya virginiana
Oxydendrum arboreum

P
Panicum grass
Parthenocissus quinquefolia
Passiflora incarnata
Paulownia tomentosa
Persea borbonia
Physocarpus opulifolias
Picea abies
Pinckneya bracteata
Pinus clausa
Pinus echinata
Pinus elliotii
Pinus glabra
Pinus nigra
Pinus palustris
Pinus rigida
Pinus serotina
Pinus strobus
Pinus taeda
Pinus virginiana
Platanus occidentialis
Poncirus trifoliata
Populus deltoides
Prunus caroliniana
Prunus mexicana
Prunus serotina
Prunus serrulata
Ptelea trifoliata

Q
Quercus aqutissima
Quercus alba
Quercus austrina
Quercus bicolor
Quercus Boyntonii
Quercus coccinea
Quercus falcata var. falcata
Quercus falcata var. pagodaefolia
Quercus hemisphaerica
Quercus imbricaria
Quercus incana
Quercus lyrata
Quercus macrocarpa
Quercus marilandica
Quercus michauxii
Quercus muehlenbergii
Quercus nigra
Quercus nuttallii
Quercus palustris
Quercus phellos
Quercus prinus
Quercus rubra
Quercus shumardii
Quercus stellata var. margaretta
Quercus stellata var. stellata
Quercus velutina
Quercus virginiana

R
Rhamnus caroliniana
Rhapidophyllum hystrix
Rhododendron alabamensis
Rhododendron austrinum
Rhododendron carolinianum
Rhododendron maximum
Rhododendron minus
Rhododendron nudiflorum
Rhus glabra
Rhus typhinia
Robinia pseudoacacia
Rosmarinus officinalis

S
Sagittaria lancifolia media
Sagittaria latifolia
Salix eriocephala
Salix nigra
Sambucus canadensis
Sapium sebiferum
Sassafras albidium
Sarracenia oreophila
Sideroxylon lanuginosum
Sideroxylon lycioides
Smilax
Staphylea trifolia
Stewartia malacodendron
Styrax grandifolia
Styrax americanus
Symplocos tinctoria

T
Taxodium ascendens
Taxodium distichum
Tilia americana
Tilia heterophylla
Toxicodendron pubescens
Toxicodendron radicans
Toxicodendron vernix
Trachelospermum jasminoides
Tsuga caroliniana
Tsuga canadensis

U
Ulmus americana
Ulmus rubra

V
Vaccinium arboreum
Viburnum acerifolium
Viburnum dentatum
Viburnum nudum
Viburnum prunifolium
Viburnum rufidulum
Vitis rotundifolia

W
Wisteria floribunda
Wisteria sinensis

Y
Yucca filamentosa
Yucca gloriosa

Z
Zanthoxylum clava-herculis
Zephyranthes atamasca

See also 

 List of botanical gardens and arboretums in Alabama
 Flora and fauna of Alabama
 Alabama Champion Tree Program

References

External links
Donald E. Davis Arboretum
The Alabama Plant Conservation Alliance
American Public Gardens Association

Botanical gardens in Alabama
Arboreta in Alabama
Auburn University
Auburn, Alabama
Protected areas of Lee County, Alabama
Nature centers in Alabama
1963 establishments in Alabama
Entertainment venues in Alabama